Zimbabwe Rhodesia, alternatively known as Zimbabwe-Rhodesia, also informally known as Zimbabwe or Rhodesia, and sometimes as Rhobabwe, was a short-lived sovereign state that existed from 1 June 1979 to 18 April 1980, though lacked international recognition. Zimbabwe Rhodesia was preceded by another state named the Republic of Rhodesia and was briefly under a British-supervised transitional government sometimes referred to as a reestablished Southern Rhodesia, which according to British constitutional theory had remained the lawful government in the area after Unilateral Declaration of Independence (UDI) in 1965. About three months later, the re-established colony of Southern Rhodesia was granted internationally recognised independence within the Commonwealth as the Republic of Zimbabwe.

Under pressure from the international community to satisfy the civil rights movement by black people in Rhodesia, an "Internal Settlement" was drawn up between the Smith administration of Rhodesia and moderate African nationalist parties not involved in the Communist insurgency. Meanwhile, the government continued to battle armed resistance from both Soviet- and Chinese-backed insurgents. The Rhodesian Bush War was an extension of the Cold War, being a proxy conflict between the West and East, similar to those in Vietnam and Korea, though Rhodesia was left alone with no support from any major Western powers against the insurgency.

The "Internal Settlement" agreement led to relaxation of education, property and income qualifications for voter rolls, resulting in the first ever black-majority electorate. The country's civil service, judiciary, police and armed forces continued to be administered by the same officials as before, of whom most were white people, due to the composition of the upper-middle class of the period. Despite these changes, the new state did not gain international recognition, with the Commonwealth claiming that the "so-called 'Constitution of Zimbabwe Rhodesia would be "no more legal and valid" than the UDI constitution it replaced.

Nomenclature

As early as 1960, African nationalist political organisations in Rhodesia agreed that the country should use the name "Zimbabwe"; they used that name as part of the titles of their organisations. The name "Zimbabwe", broken down to Dzimba dzamabwe in Shona (one of the two major languages in the country), means "houses of stone". Meanwhile, the white Rhodesian community was reluctant to drop the name "Rhodesia", hence a compromise was met.

The Constitution named the new state simply as "Zimbabwe Rhodesia", with no reference to its status as a republic in its name. As such, it was similar in style to post-1994 South Africa renaming the Natal province as "KwaZulu-Natal". Although the official name contained no hyphen, the country's name was hyphenated in some foreign publications as "Zimbabwe-Rhodesia". The country was also nicknamed "Rhobabwe", a blend of "Rhodesia" and "Zimbabwe".

After taking office as Prime Minister, Abel Muzorewa sought to drop "Rhodesia" from the country's name. The name "Zimbabwe Rhodesia" had been criticised by some black politicians like Senator Chief Zephaniah Charumbira, who said it implied that Zimbabwe was "the son of Rhodesia". ZANU PF, led by Robert Mugabe in exile, denounced what it described as "the derogatory name of 'Zimbabwe Rhodesia. The proposed changes to the name were not implemented.

The government also adopted a new national flag, featuring the same Zimbabwe soapstone bird, on 2 September of that year. In addition, it announced changes to public holidays, with Rhodes Day and Founders Day being replaced by two new holidays, both of which were known as Ancestors Day, while Republic Day and Independence Day were to be replaced by President's Day and Unity Day, celebrated on 25 and 26 October of that year.

In response, the Voice of Zimbabwe radio service operated by ZANU-PF from Maputo in Mozambique, carried a commentary entitled "The proof of independence is not flags or names", dismissing the changes as aimed at "strengthening the racist puppet alliance's position at the Zimbabwe conference in London".

The national airline, Air Rhodesia, was also renamed Air Zimbabwe. However, no postage stamps were issued; issues of 1978 still used "Rhodesia", and the next stamp issues were in 1980, after the change to just "Zimbabwe," and were inscribed accordingly.

Government of Zimbabwe Rhodesia

Zimbabwe Rhodesia's short-lived government was elected prior to the creation of the state, with the 1979 Rhodesian general election, the first in which a majority of elected representatives were black.

Constitution

Adapting the constitution of the Unilateral Declaration of Independence (UDI), Zimbabwe Rhodesia was governed by a Prime Minister and Cabinet chosen from the majority party in a 100-member House of Assembly. A 40-member Senate acted as the upper House, and both together chose a figurehead President in whose name the government was conducted.

Legislative branch

House of Assembly

Of the 100 members of the House of Assembly, 72 were "common roll" members for whom the electorate was every adult citizen. All of these members were black Africans. Those on the previous electoral roll of Rhodesia (due to education, property and income qualifications for voter rolls) elected 20 members; although this did not in theory exclude non-whites, very few black Africans met the qualification requirements. A delimitation commission sat in 1978 to determine how to reduce the previous 50 constituencies to 20. The remaining eight seats for old voter role non-constituency members were filled by members chosen by the other 92 members of the House of Assembly once their election was complete. In the only election held by Zimbabwe Rhodesia, Bishop Abel Muzorewa's United African National Council (UANC) won a majority in the common-roll seats, while Ian Smith's Rhodesian Front (RF) won all of the old voter roll seats. Ndabaningi Sithole's Zimbabwe African National Union (ZANU) won 12 seats.

Senate

The Senate of Zimbabwe Rhodesia had 40 members. Ten members each were returned by the old voter roll members of the House of Assembly and the common roll members, and five members each by the Council of Chiefs of Mashonaland and Matabeleland. The remaining members were directly appointed by the President under the advice of the Prime Minister.

Executive branch

President

The President of Zimbabwe Rhodesia was elected by the members of the Parliament, sitting together. At the election on 28 May 1979, Josiah Zion Gumede of the United African National Council (UANC) and Timothy Ndhlovu of the United National Federal Party (UNFP) were nominated. Gumede won by 80 votes to Ndhlovu's 33.

Prime Minister

Starting with 51 seats out of 100, Abel Muzorewa of the UANC was appointed as Prime Minister, and also appointed Minister of Combined Operations and Defence. He formed a joint government with Ian Smith, the former Prime Minister of Rhodesia, who was a Minister without Portfolio. Muzorewa also attempted to include the other African parties who had lost the election. Rhodesian Front members served as Muzorewa's ministers of justice, agriculture, and finance, with David Smith continuing in the role of Minister of Finance, while P. K. van der Byl, the former Minister of Defence, serving as both Minister of Transport and Minister of Power and Posts.

End of Zimbabwe Rhodesia
 
The Lancaster House Agreement stipulated that control over the country be returned to the United Kingdom in preparation for elections to be held in the spring of 1980. Accordingly, on 11 December 1979, the Constitution of Zimbabwe Rhodesia (Amendment) (No. 4) Act, declaring that "Zimbabwe Rhodesia shall cease to be an independent State and become part of Her Majesty's dominions", was passed.

In response, the Parliament of the United Kingdom passed the Southern Rhodesia Constitution (Interim Provisions) Order 1979, establishing the offices of Governor and Deputy Governor of Southern Rhodesia, filled by Lord Soames and Sir Antony Duff respectively.

Although the name of the country formally reverted to Southern Rhodesia at this time, the name "Zimbabwe Rhodesia" remained in many of the country's institutions, such as the Zimbabwe Rhodesia Broadcasting Corporation. On 18 April 1980, Southern Rhodesia became the independent Republic of Zimbabwe within the Commonwealth of Nations.

See also

Colonial history of Southern Rhodesia
Education in Zimbabwe
Rhodesian Bush War
History of Zimbabwe
Federation of Rhodesia and Nyasaland
Colony of Southern Rhodesia
Rhodesia
Republic of Zimbabwe

References

External links 

 

.
1970s disestablishments in Rhodesia
1970s in Rhodesia
1979 disestablishments in Africa
1979 establishments in Rhodesia
English-speaking countries and territories
Former countries in Africa
Former republics
Former unrecognized countries
History of Rhodesia
History of Zimbabwe
Provisional governments
States and territories disestablished in 1979
States and territories established in 1979
Zimbabwe and the Commonwealth of Nations
Former countries
Rhodesian Bush War